Aghia Sofia (literally Holy Wisdom) is an under-construction metro station serving Thessaloniki Metro's Line 1 and Line 2. The station is named after the church of Hagia Sophia, located nearby. It is expected to enter service in 2023 Construction of this station has been held back by major archaeological finds, and it is designated as a high-importance archaeological site by Attiko Metro, the company overseeing its construction. Additionally, a public square was also found at this station. The discovery was so major that it delayed the entire Metro project for years. A historian dubbed the discovery "the Byzantine Pompeii".

Aghia Sofia station will feature a mini museum within the station, similar to those of Athens Metro stations like Syntagma, which houses the Syntagma Metro Station Archaeological Collection. Unlike , however, the archaeological finds will not be kept in situ; they will be disassembled and reassembled elsewhere.

The station also appears in the 1988 Thessaloniki Metro proposal.

References

See also
List of Thessaloniki Metro stations

Thessaloniki Metro